Sympistis umbrifascia is a species of moth in the family Noctuidae (the owlet moths).

The MONA or Hodges number for Sympistis umbrifascia is 10122.

References

Further reading

 
 
 

umbrifascia
Articles created by Qbugbot
Moths described in 1894